Tamira Paszek and Coco Vandeweghe were the defending champions, having won the event in 2013, however both players chose not to participate.

Verónica Cepede Royg and María Irigoyen won the title, defeating Asia Muhammad and Maria Sanchez in the final, 6–3, 5–7, [11–9].

Seeds

Draw

References 
 Draw

Red Rock Pro Open - Doubles
Doubles